Barbara Królka  (died 1664 or 1670), was a Polish alleged witch. Her case was among the more famed of Polish witch trials.  

Barbara Królka was accused of having cast a spell upon Wacław Jeziorkowski and his family. She was also blamed for having caused by magic the plague which took place almost fifty years earlier in 1624. She was judged guilty as charged by the local mayor of Wizna and executed by burning. 

In one source she was also credited with enchanting of King Zygmunt August and causing the deaths of queens Elżbieta Habsburżanka (1545) and Barbara Radziwiłłówna (1551).

References

17th-century Polish people
17th-century Polish women
People executed for witchcraft
People executed by burning
Witch trials in Poland